"Free to Decide" is a 1996 song recorded by Irish rock band the Cranberries, released the second single from their third studio album, To the Faithful Departed (1996), on 1 July 1996. The song achieved minor chart success in most of the European countries where it was released, but it saw its greatest success in Canada, peaking at number two on the RPM Top Singles chart. On the US charts, it peaked at number twenty-two on the Billboard Hot 100 and number eight on the Modern Rock Tracks chart.

In 2017, the song was released as an acoustic version on the band's Something Else album.

Composition
The song is written in the key of G major with a tempo of 118 beats per minute.

Music video
The music video was directed by Marty Callner and was shot in a desert. Dolores O'Riordan escapes from the press and drives in her jeep as her band performs with yellow walls behind them.  Dolores appears in a white outfit singing the song in a birdcage and dancing by a giant picture frame.  At the end of the video, the last 30 seconds plays the interlude where the whole video reverses back to the beginning.

Track listings
UK CD single
 "Free to Decide" – 4:25
 "Salvation" (Live at Milton Keynes Bowl) – 2:23
 "Bosnia" – 5:37

Spain CD single
 "Free to Decide" – 4:25
 "Cordell" – 3:41
 "The Picture I View" – 2:29

Europe CD single
 "Free to Decide" – 4:25
 "Salvation" (Live at Milton Keynes Bowl) – 2:22
 "Sunday" (Live at The Point, Dublin) – 3:13
 "Dreaming My Dreams" (Live at The Point, Dublin) – 4:34

Personnel 

 Dolores O'Riordan – lead and backing vocals, electric guitar, organ
 Noel Hogan – electric guitar
 Mike Hogan – bass guitar
 Fergal Lawler – drums, percussion

Charts

Weekly charts

Year-end charts

References

1996 singles
1996 songs
The Cranberries songs
Island Records singles
Music videos directed by Marty Callner
Song recordings produced by Bruce Fairbairn
Songs written by Dolores O'Riordan